Hösel is a railway station in Ratingen in western Germany. It serves the outlying town part of Hösel.

Operational usage
The station today sees regular service by Rhein-Ruhr S-Bahn trains on the S 6 line.

Notes

S6 (Rhine-Ruhr S-Bahn)
Rhine-Ruhr S-Bahn stations
Railway stations in Germany opened in 1872